The 1911–12 season was the nineteenth season in which Dundee competed at a Scottish national level, playing in Division One, where they would finish in 8th place. Dundee would also compete in the Scottish Cup, where they would make it to the 2nd round before losing to Heart of Midlothian.

Scottish Division One 

Statistics provided by Dee Archive.

League table

Scottish Cup 

Statistics provided by Dee Archive.

Player Statistics 
Statistics provided by Dee Archive

|}

See also 

 List of Dundee F.C. seasons

References 

 

Dundee F.C. seasons
Dundee